The seventh running of Gent–Wevelgem's women's race (also known as Gent-Wevelgem In Flanders Fields) was a cycling event held in Belgium on Sunday 25 March 2018. It was the fifth leg of the 2018 UCI Women's World Tour. The race started in Ypres and finished in Wevelgem. Italian Marta Bastianelli won the race in a group sprint before Belgian Jolien D'Hoore and German Lisa Klein.

Results

See also
 2018 in women's road cycling

References

Gent-Wevelgem
Gent-Wevelgem
Gent–Wevelgem
Gent-Wevelgem (women's race)